Killian Doyle (born 18 April 1997) is an Irish hurler who plays as a centre-forward with the Westmeath senior team.

Born in Raharney, County Westmeath, Doyle developed as a hurler during his secondary schooling at St. Joseph's Secondary School in Rochfortbridge. Here he was an All-Ireland runner-up in 2012. Doyle simultaneously made his first appearances for the Raharney club at underage levels, before winning county senior championship medals in 2014 and 2016.

Doyle made his debut on the inter-county scene at the age of fifteen when he was selected for the Westmeath minor team. He enjoyed four championship seasons with the minor team. Doyle subsequently joined the Westmeath under-21 team. He made his senior debut during the 2016 league.

On 8 September 2022, Doyle was nominated for a PwC All-Star award, Westmeath's first hurling nomination since 1986 when David Kilcoyne won their first and only All-Star.

Career statistics

Honours

Raharney
Westmeath Senior Hurling Championship (2): 2014, 2016

Westmeath
Joe McDonagh Cup: 2021

References

1997 births
Living people
Raharney hurlers
Westmeath inter-county hurlers